Great Ganilly ("great saltwater downs") is one of the Eastern Isles of the Isles of Scilly. It has a maximum total area of 0.13 square kilometres and a highest point of 34 metres above sea level, located in the middle of the island. There are two known cairns near the summit.

References

 Weatherhill, Craig Cornish Placenames and Language. (Sigma Press 1995, 1998, 2000) 

Uninhabited islands of the Isles of Scilly